KALV may refer to:

 KALV (AM), a radio station (1430 AM) licensed to serve Alva, Oklahoma, United States
 KALV-FM, a radio station (101.5 FM) licensed to serve Phoenix, Arizona, United States